The Ulladan are an Adivasi group in Idukki District, Kerala, India.  Most of them are agricultural workers and forest gatherers.  However some have moved to the plains and work as wood-cutters or yacht-makers.  A few Ulladan work for the government, and in general they have a higher level of education than most of the Adivasi groups in Idukki.

Sources 
 website on Adivasi in Idukki District

Ethnic groups in India
Scheduled Tribes of India
Social groups of Kerala